Morenz may refer to:
 Brian Morenz (born 1949), a retired Canadian professional ice hockey player
 Howie Morenz (1902–1937), a Canadian professional ice hockey player
 Ludwig David Morenz (born 1965), German professor in Egyptology at the University of Bonn
 Shea Morenz (born 1974), a former American football and baseball player

it:Morenz